Kane Ryan Ferdinand (born 7 October 1992) is a professional footballer who plays as a midfielder for National League club Maidenhead United. Ferdinand has previously played for Southend United, Peterborough United, Dagenham & Redbridge and East Thurrock United and has had loan spells at Northampton Town, Luton Town, and Cheltenham Town. He has also represented the Republic of Ireland on several occasions at youth level.

Club career

Southend United
Born in Newham, London, Ferdinand came through Southend United's youth system. He made his first-team debut on 1 January 2011, playing 90 minutes in a 2–0 away win over Oxford United in League Two. On 15 February 2011, Ferdinand scored his first goal for the club in a 3–2 victory over Wycombe Wanderers. In March 2011, Ferdinand signed a two-and-a-half-year professional contract with Southend. He played in 45 games, scoring seven goals, during the 2011–12 season as Southend reached the League Two play-off semi-finals.

Peterborough United
On 31 August 2012, Ferdinand signed for Peterborough United on a four-year contract for an initial fee of £200,000, which could rise to £500,000. He made his debut on 15 September 2012 in a 5–2 away defeat to Burnley. He went on to play 33 times for Peterborough in the Championship during the 2012–13 season, scoring once – the winning goal in a 1–0 victory away to Blackpool on 16 March 2013. Peterborough were relegated to League One on the last day of the season, and Ferdinand fell out of first-team contention. He joined League Two club Northampton Town on 31 October 2013 on a one-month loan. After making five appearances at Northampton, impressing manager Aidy Boothroyd, his loan ended early on 28 November as he was recalled by Peterborough. Ferdinand played in three games for Peterborough following his recall, before being sent on loan for the rest of the season to Conference Premier leaders Luton Town on 3 January 2014. He made one substitute appearance in the league for Luton, as well as starting in the FA Trophy, before returning to Peterborough. Luton manager John Still stated that Ferdinand had "not done as well as I had hoped." In November 2014, Ferdinand joined Cheltenham Town on a two-month loan.

Ferdinand left Peterborough United in July 2015 by mutual consent.

In August 2015, he signed for Dagenham & Redbridge on an initial one-month contract. In February 2016, it was announced that he had left Dagenham by mutual consent, having failed to be offered a new contract.

Non-league Spells
On 2 September 2016, Ferdinand signed for National League South club East Thurrock United. A day later, Ferdinand made his East Thurrock United debut in a 6–0 away victory over Truro City, replacing Joe Gardner in the 75th minute. On 24 September 2016, Ferdinand scored his first East Thurrock United goal in a 2–2 draw with Bishop's Stortford, equalizing with three minutes remaining. On 12 December 2016, he scored the winner in a 4–3 away victory over Aldershot Town in an FA Trophy tie.

Woking
On 23 December 2016, Ferdinand signed for National League club Woking. Three days later, Ferdinand made his Woking debut in a 4–0 away defeat against Aldershot Town, featuring for the entire 90 minutes. Ferdinand signed a new one-year contract after impressing new Woking manager Anthony Limbrick, contracting him to the club until May 2018. On 28 August 2017, Ferdinand scored his first goal for Woking during their 4–1 victory over Torquay United. On 21 October 2017, Ferdinand was sent off during Woking's league tie against Bromley after a challenge on Jordan Higgs.

On 25 July 2018, despite Woking's relegation to the National League South, he agreed a new one-year deal following a successful trial period under new manager, Alan Dowson. In the month of August 2018, Ferdinand became a key figure in Dowson's side, starting all seven games and netting two crucial goals in their wins over Truro City and Eastbourne Borough. Despite an impressive start to the campaign, Ferdinand was in turn, ruled out until late April 2019, after sustaining a serious knee injury back in October 2018. On 12 May 2019, Ferdinand was part of the side that triumphed over Welling United in the National League South play-off final to secure promotion back to the National League at the first time of asking.

On 15 June 2021, it was announced that Ferdinand would leave the club at the end of his contract, collating a total of 162 appearances, scoring 16 goals in all competitions during his four years.

Maidenhead United
On 21 June 2021, Ferdinand joined Maidenhead United following his release from Woking.

International career
Ferdinand has represented the Republic of Ireland at underage level. He qualifies for Ireland through his Irish mother.

Personal life
He is the cousin of fellow professional footballer Anton Ferdinand, and former England international footballers Rio Ferdinand and Les Ferdinand.

Career statistics

Honours

Club
Woking
National League South play-offs: 2018–19

References

External links
Kane Ferdinand profile at the Woking F.C. website
Kane Ferdinand profile at the Football Association of Ireland website

1992 births
Living people
Footballers from the London Borough of Newham
English footballers
Republic of Ireland association footballers
Republic of Ireland youth international footballers
Republic of Ireland under-21 international footballers
Association football midfielders
Southend United F.C. players
Peterborough United F.C. players
Northampton Town F.C. players
Luton Town F.C. players
Cheltenham Town F.C. players
Dagenham & Redbridge F.C. players
East Thurrock United F.C. players
Woking F.C. players
Maidenhead United F.C. players
English Football League players
National League (English football) players
Black British sportsmen
English people of Irish descent